Eucratides II was a Greco-Bactrian king of the 2nd century BC who was a successor, and probably a son, of Eucratides I. It seems likely that Eucratides II ruled for a relatively short time after the murder of his namesake, until he was dethroned in the dynastic civil war caused by the same murder, since Justin reports:

"As Eucratides returned from India, he was killed on the way back by his son, whom he had associated to his rule, and who, without hiding his patricide, as if he didn't kill a father but an enemy, ran with his chariot over the blood of his father, and ordered the corpse to be left without a sepulture" Justin 41.6 

During his earlier years, Eucratides II may have been a co-regent of his father: on his later coins he adds the title Soter (Saviour), which could be an indication that he now ruled in his own right.

Soon after Eucratides' II death, the last Bactrian king Heliocles I (probably another member of the same Diodotid dynasty) was defeated by the Yuezhi tribes, who expelled the Greek kings from Bactria.

See also
 Greco-Bactrian Kingdom
 Seleucid Empire
 Greco-Buddhism
 Indo-Scythians
 Indo-Parthian Kingdom
 Kushan Empire

References

 The Shape of Ancient Thought. Comparative studies in Greek and Indian Philosophies by Thomas McEvilley (Allworth Press and the School of Visual Arts, 2002) 
 Buddhism in Central Asia by B. N. Puri (Motilal Banarsidass Pub, January 1, 2000)  
 The Greeks in Bactria and India by W.W. Tarn, Cambridge University Press.

External links
Le Roi Eucratide II de Bactriane

Greco-Bactrian kings
2nd-century BC rulers in Asia
Year of death unknown
Year of birth unknown
Diodotid dynasty